Marek Trejgis (born 4 March 1975) is a Polish former professional footballer who played as a forward.

Career
Trejgis began his professional football career with Hamburger SV, the club with whom he would make 11 Bundesliga appearances. He had a brief spell with Panionios where he made two appearances for the club in the Alpha Ethniki.

References

1975 births
Living people
People from Stargard
Sportspeople from West Pomeranian Voivodeship
Polish footballers
Association football forwards
Hamburger SV players
FC St. Pauli players
Holstein Kiel players
Stuttgarter Kickers players
Panionios F.C. players
Bundesliga players
Polish expatriate footballers
Polish expatriate sportspeople in Germany
Expatriate footballers in Germany
Polish expatriate sportspeople in Greece
Expatriate footballers in Greece